Albert Oscar Clark (1858–1935), commonly known as A.O. Clark, was an American architect who worked in Arkansas in the early 1900s.

He was born in Medina, New York.  He "had established himself as a partner of the firm Mathews and Clark in St. Louis, Missouri, as of 1882, at the relatively young age of twenty-three", and worked there for 23 years in total.

He came from St. Louis, Missouri to Rogers, Arkansas in 1904, to open a second office of the firm, and remained there for the rest of his life.  He is mostly known for his designs of "imposing" Benton County public buildings, commercial buildings, and churches, but also designed houses.

He utilized Classic Revival style when designing the Applegate Drugstore (1906) and Bank of Rogers Building. After his work found approval, Clark was hired to build many buildings in Bentonville, Arkansas including the Benton County Jail and the Benton County Courthouse (1928).

A number of his works are listed on the U.S. National Register of Historic Places.

Works include:
Applegate Drugstore, built 1906, 116 1st St. Rogers, AR (Clark, A.O.), NRHP-listed
Bank of Rogers Building, 114 S. 1st St. Rogers, AR (Clark, A.O.), NRHP-listed
Benton County Courthouse, 106 S.E. A St. Bentonville, AR (Clark, A.O.), NRHP-listed
Benton County Jail, 212 N. Main St. Bentonville, AR (Clark, A.O.), NRHP-listed
Benton County National Bank, 123 W. Central Bentonville, AR (Clarke, Albert Oscar), NRHP-listed
First Presbyterian Church, 212 College Ave. Clarksville, AR (Clarke, A.O.), NRHP-listed
Freeman-Felker House, 318 W. Elm St. Rogers, AR (Clark, A.O.), NRHP-listed
Charles Juhre House, 406 N. 4th St. Rogers, AR (Clark, A.O.), NRHP-listed
Raymond Munger Memorial Chapel-University of the Ozarks, W of AR 103, University of the Ozarks campus Clarksville, AR (Clark, A.O.), NRHP-listed
Mutual Aid Union Building, 2nd and Poplar Sts. Rogers, AR (Clarke, Albert O.), NRHP-listed
Oklahoma Row Hotel Site, AR 94 Spur at shore of Beaver Lake Monte Ne, AR (Clarke, Albert O.), NRHP-listed
Old Springdale High School, Johnson St. Springdale, AR (Clark, A. O.), NRHP-listed
Rogers City Hall, 202 W. Elm St. Rogers, AR (Clark, A.O.), NRHP-listed
Stroud House, built 1912, 204 S. Third St. Rogers, AR (Clark, A.O.), NRHP-listed
One or more works in Rogers Commercial Historic District (Boundary Increase), 116 S, Second St. Rogers, AR (Clarke, A.O.), NRHP-listed
One or more works in Walnut Street Historic District, Walnut St. Rogers, AR (Clark, A.O.), NRHP-listed

References

19th-century American architects
Architects from Missouri
Architects from Arkansas
People from Medina, New York
1858 births
1935 deaths
20th-century American architects